Pádraig Carney (1928 – 9 June 2019) was a Gaelic footballer who played as a centre-forward for the senior Mayo county team.
 
He was one of the last two living players from the winning 1951 Mayo team, the other being Paddy Prendergast. Carney first played for the senior team while he was still a minor in the 1946 championship and was a regular member of the starting fifteen until his retirement after the National League final in 1954. During that time, he won two All-Ireland medals, four Connacht medals and two National League medals. Carney also had the distinction of being the first player to score a goal from a penalty in an All-Ireland final.

Carney played club football with a range of clubs. However, it was with Castlebar Mitchels that he won two county championship medals.

He died in June 2019, at the age of 91.

Career statistics

References

1928 births
2019 deaths
Castlebar Mitchels Gaelic footballers
Irish expatriates in the United States
Irish gynaecologists
Irish obstetricians
Mayo inter-county Gaelic footballers
Connacht inter-provincial Gaelic footballers
Winners of two All-Ireland medals (Gaelic football)
20th-century Irish medical doctors